Karbala International Airport is an airport under development in Karbala Governorate, Iraq. It was expected to be Iraq's largest airport upon completion, and to receive an inaugural flight in July 2018, but has been affected by corruption.

History and description 
The foundation stone of Karbala International Airport was laid by Shaikh Abdul-Mahdi al-Karbala'i, a representative of Grand Ayatollah Ali as-Sistani, and Chief Cleric of Imam Husayn Holy Shrine, in January 2017. It is being constructed by the United Kingdom's Copperchase Ltd., and designed by the French ADPI Company. At , the airport's runway is the longest of its kind in Iraq. According to Al-Karbala'i, it was not meant to compete with other airports, but only to serve pilgrims going to the Mosques of Imam Husayn and Abbas.

See also 
 Imam Husayn ibn Ali
 Abbas ibn Ali
 List of airports in Iraq

References

External links 
 Final Design of Karbala International Airport (YouTube)
 Video of final design of Karbala International Airport released
 شاهد تصميم مطار كربلاء الدولي (in Arabic)
 تصوير جوي لآخر أعمال المرحلة الأولى من إنشاء مطار كربلاء الدولي

Airports in Iraq
Karbala Governorate